There are 67 state parks, nine state recreation areas, nine state waysides, and 23 state trails in the Minnesota state park system, totaling approximately .  A Minnesota state park is an area of land in the U.S. state of Minnesota preserved by the state for its natural, historic, or other resources. Each was created by an act of the Minnesota Legislature and is maintained by the Minnesota Department of Natural Resources. The Minnesota Historical Society operates sites within some of them. The park system began in 1891 with Itasca State Park when a state law was adopted to "maintain intact, forever, a limited quantity of the domain of this commonwealth...in a state of nature."  Minnesota's state park system is the second oldest in the United States, after New York's.

Minnesota's state parks are spread across the state in such a way that there is a state park within  of every Minnesotan. The most recent park created is Lake Vermilion State Park, created in 2010. Two parks include resources listed as National Natural Landmarks (Big Bog State Recreation Area and Itasca State Park) and six parks encompass National Historic Landmarks (Charles A. Lindbergh, Fort Snelling, Mille Lacs Kathio, St. Croix, Soudan Underground Mine, and Split Rock Lighthouse State Parks).  52 sites or districts across 34 Minnesota state parks are on the National Register of Historic Places (NRHP), including 22 parks with developments constructed by New Deal-era job creation programs in the 1930s.

History 
Minnesota's first attempt to create a state park came in 1885, when a  park was authorized to preserve Minnehaha Falls. The effort was delayed by legal appeals from the various landowners of the desired parkland, and by the time those were settled in favor of the state in 1889, Minnesota no longer had the money to purchase the land. Instead the city of Minneapolis fronted the cash. Owned and operated by Minneapolis, Minnehaha State Park was ultimately absorbed as a city park.

Minnesota tried again in 1891, authorizing a state park around Lake Itasca both for its recreational opportunities and to protect the source of the Mississippi River. Interstate Park on the St. Croix River was created in 1895. Other sites were added over the next two decades, but with an inconsistent vision. Modest tracts of scenic land were acquired in Minneopa and Jay Cooke State Parks, but much effort was also expended on creating historical monuments relating to the Dakota War of 1862 and the Great Hinckley Fire. Moreover, most of the sites were being administered by the state auditor, who had many other duties. Itasca State Park, meanwhile, was being administered as a state forest. In 1923, state auditor Ray P. Chase excoriated this situation, calling for wiser selection of park lands and a dedicated commissioner. Chase's comments had an impact, and two years later the Department of Conservation was created to manage the state's natural resources, including the state parks. Originally part of the forestry division, the state parks received their own division in 1935 to take advantage of federal programs such as the Civilian Conservation Corps (CCC). In 1971, the department became the Minnesota Department of Natural Resources.

The state parks were closed for almost three weeks in July 2011 due to a shutdown of the state government.

State parks and recreation areas

State waysides 
The state park system includes nine waysides, most of them along Minnesota State Highway 61 on the North Shore. These are parcels of land too small to be full-fledged parks, but with cultural or natural resources greater than would be overseen by the Minnesota Department of Transportation as highway waysides.  Generally development is limited to a parking area and a short trail; sometimes there are sanitation facilities and picnic tables as well.

State trails

Future trails 
Since Minnesota state parks and trails are authorized by the state legislature, some trails have been established in state statute, yet no usable mileage has been constructed.

Former parks 
Several units added to the Minnesota state park system over the years have since been redesignated or transferred to other agencies, including the system's very first unit, Camp Release State Memorial Wayside, created in 1889.  In most cases these decisions were due to the unit being too small for a state park with little chance of expansion, or largely local use rather than attracting visitors from all over the state and beyond.  Four of these units were redesignated as state waysides and are listed above.  The other former units were:

See also 
List of hiking trails in Minnesota
List of Minnesota state forests
List of U.S. national parks

References

Further reading 
Arthur, Anne. Minnesota's State Parks. Adventure Publications, 1998. 
Meyer, Roy Willard. Everyone's Country Estate: A History of Minnesota's State Parks. Minnesota Historical Society Press, 1991.

External links 

Minnesota State Parks on the Department of Natural Resources website
2006 Minnesota Statute sec. 85.012 State parks—statutory list
Minnesota State Park System—Legislative Auditor Report

Minnesota state parks
 
State parks